Slava (meaning "Glory") watches were classic "civil" Russian watches. The Slava factory (known originally as the Second Moscow Watch Factory) was the second non-military watchmaker established in the Soviet Union, in 1924. The watches of this brand have always been intended for civilian consumption, without military or aerospace pretensions.

In January 2006, the Slava factory and its site were sold for retail development. By 2010 the factory had been demolished for new real estate projects. The brand has been taken over by the municipality of Moscow in a debt swap.

In popular culture
In the 2016 film Glory (original title Slava), set in contemporary Bulgaria, the protagonist's Slava watch with an engraving from his father plays a key role in the plot.

References

External links
Website of Slava Trade House (partly translated)

Soviet watch brands
Watch manufacturing companies of Russia
Watch manufacturing companies of the Soviet Union